Tariq Khalifa Al Sadi is an Omani footballer currently playing as a forward for Langley.

Club career

Early life
Al Sadi first took an interest in football at the age of three, and at the age of six, his father moved him from Suwayq to Oman's capital, Muscat to pursue a career in the sport. He played for a number of academies, before settling at the Muscat Football Academy, where he stayed for two years, competing in international tournaments and winning individual awards for his performances. These performances reportedly attracted the attention of Emirati side Al-Wasl.

Move to England
At the age of nine, Al Sadi travelled to England, going on trial with professional sides Birmingham City and Fulham. After impressing at both, he returned for a second trial with Birmingham City in January 2016, and in July of the same year, his family moved to England, and he began formally training with the West Midlands side. His father states that he sold "everything he owned" to move to England two years after his son.

After six months training with Birmingham City, the club informed Al Sadi's family that the FA refused to register him due to his young age and status as a non-British citizen. He continued to train with the youth sides, but after the club's appeals to the FA were unsuccessful, he went to Manchester City, who were reportedly ready to sign him without taking him on trial, until the FA stepped in and issued the club a warning.

In June 2017, he competed in Chelsea's "Asian Star" initiative, winning a special award in the under-11 category. In December of the same year, Al Sadi signed for Aston Villa on a three-year deal. During his time with Aston Villa, he was invited to join French club Lens and Belgian side Anderlecht.

After only a year with Aston Villa, his family asked to cancel the contract prematurely, with the aim of moving to Wolverhampton Wanderers. While at Wolverhampton Wanderers, he applied to register with the FA, having resided in England for five years.

In October 2022, while playing for Langley, he went on trial with Chelsea, featuring on the bench for the club's under-18 side.

Style of play
Muscat Football Academy founder, Chuck Martini - a Moroccan former goalkeeper, described Al Sadi as a "little Messi", noted for his tricks and skills, as well as his goalscoring ability.

References

Date of birth unknown
Living people
Omani footballers
Association football forwards
Birmingham City F.C. players
Aston Villa F.C. players
Wolverhampton Wanderers F.C. players
Omani expatriate footballers
Omani expatriate sportspeople in England
Expatriate footballers in England
Year of birth missing (living people)